The 1999 FINA Diving World Cup was held in Wellington, New Zealand.

Medal winners

Men

Women

References
 "FINA Diving Results"

External links
 www.fina.org/

FINA Diving World Cup
Fina Diving World Cup
Fina Diving World Cup
Diving competitions in New Zealand
Sports competitions in Wellington
International aquatics competitions hosted by New Zealand